John Brumpton (born 28 July 1958) is an Australian actor who has appeared in a large number of local productions.

Early life

Brumpton grew up in Sydney. He graduated from the University of New South Wales in 1982 with a Bachelor of Surveying degree and then worked throughout the Northern Territory, New South Wales and the Australian Capital Territory as a surveyor. In 1985, Brumpton was the Australian (full contact) Kung Fu Champion as well as representing Australia in Amateur Boxing at the prestigious Kings Cup tournament in Thailand. In 1986, Brumpton was accepted into the Victorian College of the Arts to train as an actor; he graduated in December 1988.

Career

Writing career
In 1995, Brumpton co-wrote the feature film Life (1996), based on his play, Containment. He was nominated for Best Actor in a Leading Role and Best Adapted Screenplay, at the 1996 Australian Film Institute Awards. Life won the International Critics Prize at the 1996 Toronto International Film Festival and was invited to screen at the Berlin Film Festival. Brumpton’s short filmscript, William (2007) received production co-funding from the Australian Film Commission and Film Victoria's 2005 Short Film Fund. William was the only Australian short film selected to screen at the 2007 Sundance Film Festival. His second feature filmscript, Kid Snowball is being produced by Circe Films and directed by Matthew Saville (Noise).

Theatre
Brumpton has worked for The Melbourne Theatre Company, Playbox Theatre and Jigsaw Theatre Company.

Film
Brumpton has performed in over 60 short films including the 2006 Tropfest finalist - Silencer.

Last Ride and The Loved Ones screened in competition at the 2009 Toronto International Film Festival, where The Loved Ones won the Midnight Madness Audience Award. Brumpton portrays Eric Stone ("Daddy") in the Australian horror film The Loved Ones.

Brumpton's second film in a leading role, Dance Me to My Song (1998) was screened in competition at the 1998 Cannes Film Festival.

His third film in a leading role, Redball (1999) won the Grand Jury Prize, at the 1999 Chicago Independent Film Festival.

Filmography

Film

Television

Accolades

Notes

External links
 

Australian male film actors
Australian male television actors
Male actors from Melbourne
Living people
1959 births